Antonio Davon Blakeney (born October 4, 1996) is an American professional basketball player for the Jiangsu Dragons of the Chinese Basketball Association (CBA). He played college basketball for the LSU Tigers.

High school career
Born in Watertown, New York, Blakeney was a 2015 McDonald's All-American and Florida's Mr. Basketball.

Blakeney was rated as a 5 star recruit by Rivals, ESPN, and 247 Sports.  Rivals had him as the #13 overall recruit, while ESPN had him at #15 and 247 at #16. Both ESPN and 247 ranked him as the #3 SG in the nation.

College career
Blakeney initially gave a verbal commitment to the University of Louisville, but then Blakeney changed his mind about 10 days later and decommitted. Blakeney ended up committing to Louisiana State University. At Louisiana State University he was featured in 34 games as a freshman, playing alongside Ben Simmons. Behind Simmons and Keith Hornsby, Blakeney was LSU's third-leading scorer in 2015–16, averaging 12.6 points a contest, hitting a team-best 52 three-point shots on the season.

The 2016–17 season saw him emerge as LSU's leading scorer, pouring in 17.2 points per contest, while corralling 4.8 rebounds a game and handing out 1.7 assists per outing. Blakeney took home an All-SEC Second Team selection that year. In April 2017, he announced to forgo the remaining two years of his eligibility and declared for the 2017 NBA draft.

Professional career

Chicago Bulls (2017–2019)
After going undrafted, Blakeney joined the Chicago Bulls for the 2017 NBA Summer League. Based on his performance there, Blakeney was signed to a two-way contract by the Bulls. Under the terms of the deal, he split time between the Bulls and their G League affiliate, the Windy City Bulls. He made his professional debut with Chicago on October 19 against the Toronto Raptors. On November 21, 2017, Blakeney scored 15 points in 18 minutes off the bench in a 113–105 loss to the Los Angeles Lakers. He won the NBA G League Rookie of the Year Award for his time with the Windy City Bulls.

On July 19, 2018, Blakeney was signed to an NBA contract by the Bulls.

In the season opener on October 18, 2018, Blakeney scored 15 points off the bench in a 127–108 loss to the Philadelphia 76ers. In a 107–105 loss to the Indiana Pacers on November 2, 2018, Blakeney scored a career-high 22 points off the bench.

On September 9, 2019, Blakeney was released by the Bulls.

Canton Charge (2021)
For the 2020–21 season, Blakeney signed with the Canton Charge of the G League. In early 2021, Blakeney was arrested for armed robbery and bonded out of jail.

Al Ahli Club of Manama(2022)
On Jan, 2022, Blakeney signed with the Al-Ahli of the Bahraini Premier League. On Jan 28, 2022, he scored game-high 32 Pts in the 1st round against Al-Najma. On Feb 8, 2022 he scored 26 Pts in the 3rd round against Al-Hala. On March 22, 2022, it was revealed on instagram : @bs_action (Bahrain basketball media) that Blakeney wasn't getting paid his salaries, and that he wanted to clear the rumors that he didn't play due to injury. He left the team soon after.

Hapoel Be'er Sheva (2022)
On March 17, 2022, he has signed with Hapoel Be'er Sheva of the Israeli Basketball Premier League.

Career statistics

NBA

Regular season

|-
| style="text-align:left;"| 
| style="text-align:left;"| Chicago
| 19 || 0 || 16.5 || .371 || .288 || .769 || 1.7 || 1.1 || .4 || .1 || 7.9
|-
| style="text-align:left;"| 
| style="text-align:left;"| Chicago
| 57 || 3 || 14.5 || .419 || .396 || .658 || 1.9 || .7 || .2 || .2 || 7.3
|- class="sortbottom"
| style="text-align:center;" colspan="2"| Career
| 76 || 3 || 15.0 || .406 || .357 || .696 || 1.8 || .8 || .3 || .1 || 7.5

College

|-
| style="text-align:left;"| 2015–16
| style="text-align:left;"| LSU
| 33 || 24 || 30.8 || .425 || .335 || .748 || 3.5 || .9 || .7 || .2 || 12.6 
|-
| style="text-align:left;"| 2016–17
| style="text-align:left;"| LSU
| 31 || 30 || 32.9 || .458 || .358 || .724 || 4.8 || 1.7 || .7 || .1 || 17.2
|- class="sortbottom"
| style="text-align:center" colspan="2"| Career
| 64 || 54 || 31.8 || .444 || .347 || .736 || 4.1 || 1.3 || .7 || .1 || 14.8

References

External links 
 LSU Tigers bio 
 Profile at eurobasket.com

1996 births
Living people
21st-century African-American sportspeople
African-American basketball players
American expatriate basketball people in China
American men's basketball players
Basketball players from New York City
Basketball players from Orlando, Florida
Canton Charge players
Chicago Bulls players
Jiangsu Dragons players
LSU Tigers basketball players
McDonald's High School All-Americans
Shooting guards
Undrafted National Basketball Association players
Windy City Bulls players